Dialysis is a genus of flies in the family Xylophagidae.

Species
Dialysis aldrichi Williston, 1895
Dialysis arakawae Matsumura, 1916
Dialysis cispacifica Bezzi, 1912
Dialysis dispar Bigot, 1879
Dialysis elongata (Say, 1823)
Dialysis fasciventris (Loew, 1874)
Dialysis flava Yang & Yang, 1995
Dialysis illinoensis (Webb, 1983)
Dialysis iwatai Nagatomi, 1953
Dialysis kesseli Hardy, 1948
Dialysis lauta (Loew, 1872)
Dialysis mentata Webb, 1978
Dialysis meridionalis Yang & Yang, 1997
Dialysis pallens Yang & Nagatomi, 1994
Dialysis reparta Webb, 1978
Dialysis revelata Cockerell, 1908
Dialysis rufithorax (Say, 1823)
Dialysis sinensis Yang & Nagatomi, 1994

References

Further reading

 

Xylophagidae
Brachycera genera
Taxa named by Francis Walker (entomologist)
Diptera of Asia
Diptera of North America